The Jaguar XJ (XJ40) is a full-size luxury sedan manufactured by Jaguar Cars between 1986 and 1994. It was officially unveiled on 8 October 1986 as an all-new, second generation of the XJ to replace the Series III, although the two model ranges were sold concurrently until the Series III was discontinued in 1992. The XJ40 used the Jaguar independent rear suspension arrangement, and featured a number of technological enhancements (such as electronic instrument cluster). The 1993 XJ6 earned the title of "Safest Car in Britain" as the result of a government survey. The original 1986 car gave way to the heavily revised X300 model in 1994, followed by the X308 version in 1997.  The XJ40 and its later derivatives, is to date, the second longest running Jaguar XJ platform with a total production run of 17 years.

Development
Throughout the 1970s Jaguar had been developing "Project XJ40", which was an all-new model intended to replace the original XJ6. Scale models were being built as early as 1972. Due to the 1973 oil crisis and problems at parent company British Leyland, the car was continually delayed. Proposals from both Jaguar's in-house designers and Pininfarina were received. Eventually, it was decided an internal design would be carried through to production and, in February 1981, the British Leyland board approved £80 million to produce the new car. Launch was originally scheduled for 1984, but following Jaguar's de-merger from BL and privatization that same year, the company's CEO Sir John Egan took advantage of the resurgence in sales of the existing Series III XJ6 (particularly in the lucrative North American market) to delay the XJ40's launch a further two years to allow for more development time. 

The XJ40 was at the time, the most extensively tested vehicle the company had ever developed. Designs for the XJ40 pioneered significant improvements to how Jaguar cars were designed, built, and assembled. Among these improvements was a 25% reduction in the number of bodywork panels required per car (e.g. three pressings needed for a Series 3 door compared with one for a XJ40 door), resulting in not only a more efficient assembly process, but also a weight saving and a stiffer structure.

Despite this however, early production XJ40s still suffered from reliability (particularly with its electrical systems) and build quality issues, which damaged its reputation, and further continued Jaguar's poor reputation for quality, despite the extensive testing of the car, and the engineering efforts to improve quality. The protracted development time meant the car dated much quicker than its rivals, and it was quickly superseded technologically by the E32 BMW 7-Series (1986), the Lexus LS400 (1989) and the W140 Mercedes-Benz S-Class (1991). Following the takeover by Ford in 1990 the XJ40 was replaced by the X300 which whilst based on the XJ40 platform was highly revised in almost all areas.

Mechanicals

Initially, only two engines were offered across the XJ40 models: a 2.9 L and a 3.6 L version of the AJ6 inline-six. In 1990 the 3.6 L was replaced by a 4.0 L model and in 1991 the 2.9 L was replaced by a 3.2 L model.

During the development of the XJ40, British Leyland had considered providing the Rover V8 engine for the car, which would have eliminated the need for future Jaguar engine production. The XJ40 bodyshell was allegedly engineered to prevent fitting V-configuration engines - in particular the Rover V8 - which British Leyland management had desired; this delayed the introduction of the V12-powered XJ12 until 1993 as the front structure of the XJ40 had to be extensively redesigned. As a consequence, the preceding Series III XJ was kept in production in V12 form to cater for this market need until 1992.

The automatic gearbox used in the 2.9 L, 3.2 L and 3.6 L six-cylinder cars was the four-speed ZF 4HP22. On the 4.0 L, the four-speed ZF 4HP24 was used. A stronger automatic gearbox was required for the V12-equipped cars, and the four-speed GM 4L80-E was selected. The manual gearbox fitted to early cars was the five-speed Getrag 265, while later cars received the Getrag 290.

The automatic transmission selector was redesigned to allow the manual selection of forward gears without accidentally selecting neutral or reverse. This new feature was dubbed the "J-Gate" and remained a staple of all Jaguar models up until the 2008 Jaguar XF, when shift by wire technology rendered it redundant - all subsequent Jaguar models now use a rotary knob for transmission mode selection.

Exterior
The curvaceous lines of the outgoing Series XJ were replaced by the more angular, geometric shape of the XJ40.

For the first production run, all headlamps fitted were a set of two round lamps inside a chrome housing with painted bezels or a set of form-fitting composite rectangular headlamps with power-wash sprayers. The lower trim level had painted bezels without chrome. The latter were fitted to the higher trim levels: Sovereign and Daimler. The US safety regulations allowed the form-fitting composite headlamps in 1983 for the model year 1984 onward. However, the lengthy lead time for American type approval didn't give Jaguar the opportunity to change, at the last minute, to the popular composite rectangular headlamps in time for the US launch. During the 1990 model year refresh, the US-specified XJ40 received the composite rectangular headlamps for entire trim levels. The European headlamps have single reflector for low and high beams behind the flatter glass lens. The US headlamps have two separate reflectors for low and high beams behind the slightly bulbous plastic lens.

The bumper is a visually distinct black-rubber-covered bar that runs the full width of the car and incorporates the sidelights and indicator lights. The bonnet is hinged at the front. Window frames are either chromed or black, depending on model. Rain gutters, door mirrors, and door handles are also finished in chrome. All XJ40s have a chrome surround for the windshield and a single wide-sweeping wiper.

Early low-specification cars were fitted with metric-sized steel wheels and plastic wheelcovers. From 1991, the wheels were changed to imperial sizing.

Interior

The interior of the XJ40 was trimmed with either walnut or rosewood, and either cloth or leather upholstery (depending on model.)

Until 1990, cars were fitted with an instrument binnacle that used digital readouts for the ancillary gauges. Instrumentation included a vacuum fluorescent display named the "Vehicle Condition Monitor" (VCM), which contained a 32x32 dot-matrix screen capable of 34 functions. The VCM was able to alert the driver of bulb failure, brake pad wear, unlatched doors/boot, and low coolant level. However, the binnacle was notoriously unreliable and from 1990 on, the binnacle was redesigned to use analogue gauges.

Early cars used a two-spoke steering wheel that was later changed for a four-spoke airbag-equipped wheel. The glovebox was removed on later cars because of the space occupied when the passenger-side airbag was introduced.

Models

XJ6 1986-1994
The base XJ6 of the model range was modestly equipped; extra-cost options included alloy wheels, anti-lock brakes, air conditioning, leather upholstery, and an automatic transmission. The exterior featured two pairs of circular headlamps and black powder-coated window frames.

Sovereign 1986-1994
The Sovereign model came equipped with significantly more features than the base XJ6. Included was air conditioning, headlamp washers, a six-speaker sound system, rear self-levelling suspension (SLS), anti-lock braking system, and inlaid burl walnut wood trim (pre-MY1991). The headlamps fitted were the rectangular single units. The window frames were made from stainless steel.

Sport 1993-1994
Late in the XJ40 run 3.2S and 4.0S, in 1993-1994, Jaguar introduced the Sport model. It was available only with the six-cylinder engine, and featured rosewood interior trim (as opposed to the walnut trim of other models.) Both the door mirrors and radiator grill vanes were colour-keyed to the body, which was decorated with twin coachlines. Wider-profile tires were fitted, mounted on five-spoke alloy wheels.

Majestic 1989-1992 (SWB) & 1993-1994 (LWB)

A rare long-wheelbase model named the "Majestic" was produced in 1993 and 1994. These vehicles started life as a SWB body which was then taken away from the standard production line and stretched by Project Aerospace in Coventry, before being returned to Castle Bromwich plant for paint before being finally assembled on the production line at Browns Lane under the direction of Jaguar Special Vehicle Operations. This meant the Majestic carried a significant price premium over the standard models.  It was offered to all markets except the USA & Canada. This Car should never be confused with cars which were stretched into limousines through an after market company.
 
There was also a Short Wheel Base (SWB) version on the regular wheelbase for the US market only from 1989-1992, called the "Vanden Plas Majestic" but badged as "Majestic". These cars were mostly finished in Regency Red (with Red "Lattice" alloys), apart from the 1992 cars which were finished in Black Cherry (with Oyster "Roulette" alloys). A SWB USA Majestic can be identified by "M" as the fourth letter of its VIN, and the LWB rest of world Majestic's have an "M" as the seventh digit of the VIN.

Gold 1994
The Gold model was introduced in 1994 with a limited set of features and options, and for a modest price. It was available in fewer exterior colours than other models, and was identified by a gold-plated badge on the boot and gold growler badge at the top of the radiator grille. Gold cars were fitted with the "Kiwi" style wheels and painted with twin coachlines.

Insignia
In 1992, when Jaguar closed the DS420 Limo shop, all the craftsmen were left standing idle. Jaguar devised "Insignia": a bespoke service for the XJ40/XJ81 (see below) and XJS, where prospective owners could specify special paint, trim, wood and wheels at additional cost in any given combination. 318 XJ40 Insignias were produced, most of them can be identified by the oblong gold-on-black "Insignia" badges on the front wings, and by their above-standard interiors.
All of the interior trim was done in leather (two-tone colouring being an option), opposed to the leather-vinyl combinations used on regular-spec cars. Special paint colours were introduced for the Insignia: Mahogany, Amethyst Blue, Mineral Green, Primrose Pearl, Crystal Blue, Saturn Orange, Peppermint, Sandstone, White Pearl and Lavender.
A number of Insignias were put onto the Jaguar demo fleet to do the round of the dealerships to show all the options available in the Insignia line.

XJR

The XJR, introduced in 1988, was a high-performance model that was finished by the Oxfordshire-based JaguarSport company, a dual venture by Jaguar and race team TWR, at TWRs Kidlington-based factory alongside the XJ220. Based upon a Sovereign model, it was fitted with uprated suspension with unique Bilstein dampers, a revised power steering valve to increase the steering weight by 40% and special exterior paint and exterior styling touches. Early examples were fitted with a 3.6 L AJ6 engine in standard tune but later models had a TWR tuned version of the 4.0 AJ6, with new inlet manifolds, uprated cams and a tweaked ECU. Some examples are also fitted with a larger bore JaguarSport exhaust system.

The XJR differed cosmetically from other XJ40 models with its body coloured bodykit, consisting of new front and rear valances and side skirts, all from fiberglass, a black grill with a JaguarSport badge in it and unique Speedline alloy wheels with wider tyres. Later models had ducting fitted to the front valance to feed cool air directly to the brake discs. The interior featured a leather MOMO steering wheel, JaguarSport logos on the dial faces, leather shift knob, and seat headrests embossed with the JaguarSport logo.

The XJR model was introduced in 1988 and ceased production in 1994. In 1991 the appearance of the XJR changed when it switched to the square headlights of the Sovereign model and was fitted with a different design of bodykit. Only a few hundred of each variation were produced, making the cars rare today.

XJ12 and Daimler Double Six (XJ81)

Given the model code XJ81, the XJ40-based XJ12 and Daimler Double Six were introduced at the Amsterdam Auto Show in February 1993 and powered by a 6.0-litre version of Jaguar's V12 engine. This was mated to a GM 4L80E 4-speed automatic gearbox. It could be identified by the XJ12 or Double Six badge on the rear and a V12 emblem on the glovebox. The XJ12 used the two twin-headlamp pairs, black radiator grille vanes, and a gold "growler" badge on the radiator grille top, while the Daimler received the rectangular headlamps. Early cars used stainless steel window frames, on later cars they were changed to black.

Daimler / Vanden Plas
The Daimler-branded cars represented the highest trim level, and were sold as their Vanden Plas model by Jaguar dealers in the United States. Like the Sovereign, it was fitted with the single rectangular headlamps. Cosmetically, it differed from other models with its fluted radiator grille surround, boot-lid plinth and detail finishes. A Daimler interior features fold-out picnic tables for the rear passengers and a 2-passenger rear seat versus the 'flat', 3-passenger item on the Jaguars.

References

XJ
Flagship vehicles
Full-size vehicles
Luxury vehicles
Police vehicles
Sedans
Rear-wheel-drive vehicles
Cars introduced in 1986
1990s cars
Cars discontinued in 1994